Calliteara albibasalis is a moth of the family Erebidae first described by William Jacob Holland in 1893. It is found in Gabon.

References

Endemic fauna of Gabon
Moths described in 1893
Lymantriinae
Fauna of Gabon
Moths of Africa